Shymko is a Ukrainian surname. Notable people with the surname include: 

 Aleksandr Shymko (born 1977), Ukrainian composer and pianist
 Yuri Shymko (born 1940), Canadian politician

See also
 

Ukrainian-language surnames